Ernst, Prince of Saxe-Meiningen (Ernst, Prinz von Sachsen-Meiningen; 27 September 1859 – 29 December 1941) was the head of the house of Saxe-Meiningen from 1928 until his death.

Biography
He was born in Meiningen, the eldest son of the heir apparent to the duchy of Saxe-Meiningen, Prince Georg and his second wife, HSH Princess Feodora of Hohenlohe-Langenburg. His father succeeded to the throne in 1866. Ernst pursued a career in the army and retired as colonel in the Prussian cavalry. He received an honorary doctorate in philosophy from the University of Jena.

Ernst was married, morganatically, in Munich on 20 September 1892, to Katharina Jensen, daughter of the  painter Marie and the poet Wilhelm Jensen. Not permitted to share her husband's dynastic title, his wife was created Baroness von Saalfeld on their wedding day by Ernst's father, Georg II. Despite his unequal marriage, Ernst retained his succession rights to the duchy of Saxe-Meiningen.

When his older half-brother, the last reigning duke of Saxe-Meiningen, Bernhard III, died on 16 January 1928, Ernst succeeded him as head of the ducal house, but never reigned, since the monarchy was abolished at the end of World War I in 1918. Rather than his own son, Ernst's nephew Georg, Prince of Saxe-Meiningen, succeeded him as head of the house following his death at Schloss Altenstein.

Children
Ernst and Katharina had six children:

Baron Georg Wilhelm von Saalfeld (11 June 1893-29 April 1916) killed in action at the age of twenty-two.
Baroness Elisabeth Helen Adelheid Marie von Saalfeld (2 February 1895-4 June 1934) she married Dr. Johann Duken on 25 April 1917.
Baron Ernst Friedrich Heinrich Paul von Saalfeld (4 July 1896-28 May 1915) killed in action at the age of eighteen.
Baron Ralf Erich von Saalfeld (28 March 1900-22 July 1947) he married Marie Seitz (1903-1931) on 11 October 1925. They had two children. He remarried Melanie von Bismarck on 16 August 1936. They had four children.
Baron Sven Hans Heinrich Bernhard von Saalfeld (18 September 1903-13 December 1998) he married Elisabeth Faust on 20 March 1936 and they were divorced on 6 November 1952. They had five children.
Baron Enzio Heinrich Waldemar Carl von Saalfeld (7 July 1908-31 March 1941) he married Rut Viererbe on 28 February 1936. They had four children.

Ancestry

References

External links
Saalfeld family

House of Saxe-Meiningen
1859 births
1941 deaths
People from Meiningen
Princes of Saxe-Meiningen
Sons of monarchs

Non-inheriting heirs presumptive